Douglas Glen is a planned and approved CTrain light rail station in Calgary, Alberta, Canada part of the Green Line.  Construction will begin in 2022 and complete in 2027 as part of construction stage one, segment one. The station is located in the suburban residential and commercial community of Douglasdale/Douglasglen.   

The station will be located along 114 Avenue SE between 29 Street SE and 27 Street SE. The site of the station is currently used as a transit hub for buses and will be rebuilt to accommodate rail. The station is one of only three stations in stage one to feature a park and ride.

References 

CTrain stations
Railway stations scheduled to open in 2027